Foguang Temple is a Theravadin Buddhist temple located in Mangshi, Yunnan, China.

Name
The name of the temple in Dai language is "Zhuang He Xing", meaning "a Buddhist temple holds the first Buddhist texts".

History
The temple was originally built in 1873, during the region of Tongzhi Emperor (1862–1874) of the Qing dynasty (1644–1911). It used to be the palace of Fang Qinglu, who was the 20th Tusi. Towards the completion of the project, someone reported to the Qing government that the building had violated regulations, and Fang Qinglu had to change it into a Buddhist temple.

The temple was slightly damaged during the Second Sino-Japanese War. In the Cultural Revolution, most of its buildings were completely destroyed by the Red Guards, only the Main Hall and South Hall survived. After the 3rd Plenary Session of the 11th Central Committee of the Communist Party of China, the policy of religious freedom was implemented. Foguang Temple was renovated and restored in 1983.

Architecture
The Main Hall is the most important hall in the temple, it has a double-eave gable and hip roofs. The statue of Gautama Buddha is enshrined in the hall.

Gallery

References

Bibliography
 
 

Buddhist temples in Yunnan
Buildings and structures in Mangshi
Tourist attractions in Mangshi
20th-century establishments in China
20th-century Buddhist temples
Religious buildings and structures completed in 1983